The Nut may refer to:

The Nut, an old extinct volcano near Stanley, Tasmania, a town on the north-west coast of Tasmania, Australia.
The Nut (1921 film), an American film produced by, and starring, Douglas Fairbanks